Charles Riley (1854–1929) was the first Anglican Archbishop of Perth, Western Australia.

Charles Riley may also refer to:

People
 Charles Valentine Riley (1843–1895), British-born American entomologist and artist
 Charles Riley (bishop of Bendigo) (1888–1971), Anglican Bishop of Bendigo, son of the archbishop
 Charles Riley (politician), member of the New South Wales Legislative Council
 Charles Edward Riley (1883–1972), Canadian Anglican priest
 Lil Buck (Charles Riley; born 1988), American dancer

Places
 Charles Riley House, a historic house in Newton, Massachusetts

See also
 Chuck Riley (disambiguation)
 Charles Reilly (disambiguation)